The Sustainable Development Research Centre (SDRC) was a research centre based in Forres in the North of Scotland. It was an associate institute for sustainability research within the UHI Millennium Institute.

The SDRC ceased to trade in summer 2009.

References

Research and development organizations